The following is a list of current and pending affiliates of getTV, a digital multicast television network owned by Sony Pictures Entertainment, focusing on classic television shows from the 1960s through the 2000s.

Current affiliates

Former affiliates

References

External links
 www.get.tv/get-the-channel – Official list of GetTV affiliates (includes information on cable channel placements)

GetTV